Wylde:

 Wylde Green
 Wylde Green railway station

See also 
 Wilde
 Wyld (disambiguation)
 Wild (disambiguation)